Pipli, Jhelum is a village in union council Daulat pur of Jhelum District in the Punjab province of Pakistan.

School 
It has one Government girls' primary school and one Government boys' middle (Elementary) school. It was a Unicef model village.

References

Populated places in Jhelum District